Valenciniidae is a family of worms belonging to the order Heteronemertea.

Genera
Genera:
 Baseodiscus Diesing, 1850
 Borlasia Oken, 1815
 Cephalomastax Iwata, 1957
 Chilineus Friedrich, 1970
 Joubinia Bürger, 1895
 Kukumia Gibson & Sundberg, 2002
 Polina Stimpson, 1857
 Poliopsis Joubin, 1890
 Sonnenemertes Chernyshev, Abukawa & Kajihara, 2015
 Taeniosoma Stimpson, 1857
 Uchidana Iwata, 1967
 Valenciennesia Joubin, 1894
 Valencinia Quatrefages, 1846

References

Heteronemertea
Nemertea families